Henriqueta Godinho Gomes (1942 – 2018) was a former political leader in Guinea-Bissau.

Gomes was active in the African Party for the Independence of Guinea and Cape Verde for some time. Between 1998 and 1993 she served as the minister of social affairs and public health; from 1993 until 1994 she served as minister of labour.

References

1942 births
2018 deaths
Government ministers of Guinea-Bissau
Women government ministers of Guinea-Bissau
African Party for the Independence of Guinea and Cape Verde politicians